Bingley Urban District covered the town of Bingley, West Riding of Yorkshire, England, and its surrounding areas for 80 years between 1894 and 1974. It had replaced an Improvement Commissioners council, and the UDC itself was replaced in 1974, by the newly formed Bradford Metropolitan District Council. The urban district council had responsibility for many local interests, including fire service and medical provision, that are now the remit of regional or national agencies.

In 2016, limited council control was returned to the town by the election of Bingley Town Council, but its remit and the area it controls are considerably smaller than the former BUDCs authority.

History

In 1847, an act was passed that elevated 47 people into the Bingley Improvement Commissioners. This act was passed due to a great increase in the town's population, linked in with the arrival of the railway and increased industrialisation. This in turn led to slum-like and squalid living conditions, which were recognised as needing improvement. The Local Government Act 1894, paved the way for the creation of the Bingley Urban District Council (BUDC) in 1894, and on the inception of the council, they occupied a building on the main street that had been built in 1878 and was formerly occupied by a co-operative society. In 1898, the Bingley Outer District Council and the Wilsden Urban District Council were absorbed by the BUDC, thus enlargening the area. However, this only occurred after a great debate about sewerage and other utilities, with Bradford Corporation wanting assurances that the new and larger area would not supply fresh water to areas under its control. By 1955, the BUDC was responsible for Bingley, Cottingley, Cullingworth, Eldwick, Flappitt, Gilstead, Harden, Low Springs, Ryecroft and Wilsden.

In 1904, the BUDC paid £14,000 to buy up some properties on the Old Main Street and part of the graveyard of All Saints Church. This enabled them to build the new main road straight past what is now the new fire station, and across the graveyard, cutting it into two sections. This required its own Act of 1901, and the removal of interred bodies from the site, whilst the headstones were used to line the paths around the graveyard.

As a local council, they had responsibility for public services such as a fire brigade, water supply, medical needs and power supplies (gas and electricity). The BUDC also controlled the public tips in the area of which they had four in 1946; Dowley Gap, Cullingworth, Harden and Wilsden. BUDC invoked several bye-laws relating to public health in the district, and these covered slaughterhouses, markets, the cemetery, smoke abatement, recreation grounds, suppression of litter and even the sale of contraceptives in automated machines. On the social side, the BUDC organised community events such as Boer War commemorative event in 1905 (for the 1899–1902 campaign) and promoting a visit by General Booth in 1907.

In February 1914, the BUDC enabled the Bradford tram system to be extended into Bingley from Nab Wood (Saltaire). It was opened through Bingley to Crossflatts by October 1914. This entailed the widening of Cottingley Bridge and affording at least a  width on the Main Street in Bingley. The BUDC was also to be responsible for the supply of electricity, which they bought from the Keighley Corporation Tramways company. In 1928, the St Ive's estate was purchased for the area by the BUDC for £39,500. In 1923, certain offices of the BUDC were transferred from their previous BUDC offices (some being located in the Mechanics Institute) to Myrtle Grove, on the western side of the town in the rapidly developing Myrtle Park area. By 1926, all of the BUDC's operations had been transferred to Myrtle Grove which had now become the Town Hall.

In 1936, many jobs that are now the responsibility of private enterprises, official regional, or national agencies, were undertaken by the BUDC. These included;

Architect
Baths superintendent
Clerk and solicitor
Electrical engineer
Engineer and surveyor
Fire brigade superintendent
Gas engineer
Headmaster, technical and evening institutes
Health visitor and school nurse
Librarian
Manager of sewage disposal and inspector of trade wastes
Medical officer of health
Sanitary inspector
Treasurer and accounting
Water manager

The novelist John Braine worked for the BUDC in Bingley Library for several years in the 1950s. During this period, he wrote Room at the Top, which allowed him to give up his day job. However, some commented that the novel painted Bradford (and the wider area) as a "seedy, immoral place", and the BUDC criticised the library in Bingley for buying six copies of the novel.

In 1974, the Bingley UD was merged into the newly formed Metropolitan District of Bradford, along with the other Aire Valley urban districts of Baildon, Ilkley, Shipley and Silsden, and the Municipal Borough of Keighley.

Population

Chronology
1847 – 1894 Bingley Improvement commissioners, the precursor authority of the BUDC
1893 – Prince of Wales' Park created (BUDC took on this responsibility on their formation one year later)
1894 – BUDC created
1898 – The Bingley Outer and Wilsden Urban District Councils were amalgamated into Bingley Urban District Council.
1902 – A new fire station was built on Elm Tree Hill (opposite Park Road), replaced by new station in 1973
1908 – Myrtle Park purchased for the town
1912 (onwards) – The Electric Lighting Order was passed which allowed for the provision of electricity in the town. This was extended to East Morton and West Morton in 1925
3 February 1914– The Bradford Tram system was extended into Bingley from Nab Wood
1928 – Purchased the St Ives estate
31 March 1948 – Electricity generation and supply for the area was removed from the BUDC and vested in the Yorkshire Electricity Board (see Electricity Act 1947)
1948 – Gas, medical, fire, and ambulance services were removed from the BUDCs control into national and regional agencies: NHS for the medical work and West Riding County Council for the fire and ambulance provision
1974 – Opening of Bingley Arts Centre
1974 – subsumed into Bradford District Council

Notable people
John Braine, worked for the BUDC in Bingley Library in the 1950s
Tom Snowden, chairman of BUDC between 1921 and 1922
Pat Wall, worked for the BUDC in 1973, later became MP for Bradford North

Notes

References

Sources

External links
Bingley Coat of Arms

Urban districts of England
Districts of England abolished by the Local Government Act 1972
History of the City of Bradford
Districts of England created by the Local Government Act 1894
Urban District